Cultural Center station is a Baltimore Light Rail station located along Howard Street in Midtown Baltimore, Maryland. It has two side platforms served by two tracks. The station opened on April 2, 1992, as part of the first phase of the system.

References

External links

Station from Park Avenue from Google Maps Street View

Baltimore Light Rail stations
Midtown, Baltimore
Railway stations in Baltimore